This is a list of armour used by the Imperial Japanese Army in the Second Sino-Japanese War.

The present list also includes other military armoured vehicles in use at the time (armoured personnel carriers, armoured cars, armoured trains, etc.).

 
Renault FT
Renault NC27 
Type 89 I-Go medium tanks (Type 89A I-Go Kō and Type 89B I-Go Otsu)
Type 92 heavy armoured car Jyu-Sokosha - tankette
Type 94 tankette
Type 97 Te-Ke tankette
Type 95 Ha-Go light tank
Type 97 Chi-Ha medium tank
Type 97 ShinHoTo Chi-Ha medium tank
Sōkō Sagyō Ki ("SS-Ki") armored engineer vehicles
Panzer I - German tank, one captured from Chinese forces
Vickers Crossley armoured car
Wolseley armoured car
Chiyoda armored car Type 92.
Sumida M.2593 Type 91 armored railroad car So-Mo
Type 93 armoured car a/k/a Type 2593 Hokoku and Type 93 Kokusanor
Type 95 So-Ki armored railroad car
Type 1 Ho-Ki armored personnel carrier
20 mm AA machine cannon carrier truck
Improvised Armoured Train
Special Armoured Train
Type 94 Armoured Train
Type 95 Crane Vehicle Ri-Ki 
Armored Recovery Vehicle Se-Ri
Type 100 Te-Re observation vehicle
Type 94 Disinfecting Vehicle
Type 94 Gas Scattering Vehicle

Notes

References

External links
Taki's Imperial Japanese Army Page - Akira Takizawa

Armoured fighting vehicles
Second Sino-Japanese War
Second Sino-Japanese War
Second Sino-Japanese War, armoured fighting vehicles